Let Me Be a Woman: Notes to My Daughter on the Meaning of Womanhood is a 1976 book by Elisabeth Elliot that was published by Tyndale House in Wheaton, Illinois, United States. The book is 185 pages long and is about what is written about women in the Bible. The book also provides advice about marriage. Elliot gave the book to Valerie, her only child, as a gift on the day of her wedding. Elliot used the phrase "Let me be a woman" in response to Christian egalitarianism, which she said was "not a goal to be desired [because] it is a dehumanizing distortion." Her use of the phrase in this manner in 1977 at the National Women's Conference in Houston, Texas evoked considerable applause. The book contains several stories, the first of which telling about how God brought two people together from across the world into a romantic relationship with each other because of their obedience to God's leading. Another story is about the murder of John and Betty Stam, Christian martyrs. A prayer by Betty Stam is also included in the book. The prayer asks that the full will of God be done in her life, irrespective of the cost to herself. In 2003, Andrew Farmer of Crosswalk.com quoted a portion of the book in support of his argument that singleness is a spiritual gift that God gives to single people for the period in which they are single.

References

1976 non-fiction books
American non-fiction books
English-language books
Books about spirituality
Christian theology books
Evangelical Christian literature
20th-century Christian texts
Christian devotional literature
1976 in the United States
1976 in Christianity
Marriage in Christianity
Christianity and women
Femininity
Women in the United States
Women's studies
Books by Elisabeth Elliot